The Marine Service Support Regiment or MSSR ( are the marines combat support of the Royal Thai Marine Corps and Royal Thai Navy. Military units are supplied troops to support the various branches of the Royal Thai Navy. Marine Service Support Regimen is also one of the forces participating in the mission of the unrest in South Thailand insurgency.

History
On 10 August 1978 Royal Thai Navy has been established Marine Support Regiment, Marine Regiment to support and combat service of Royal Thai Marine. In 1989 has been transformed into the "Marine Service Support Regiment, Marine Division".

In 2017 Medical Battalion, Marine Service Support Regiment is one of the agencies participating in the mission of the unrest in South Thailand insurgency.

In 2018 Transport Battalion and Marine Assault Amphibious Vehicle Support Company, Marine Service Support Regiment. The amphibious landing at Khok Khian, Muang Narathiwat, Marathiwat with HTMS Angthong and HTMS Mankang for shifting troops for the missions in South Thailand insurgency.

Organization

 RTMC: Marine Service Support Regiment 
 RTMC: Medical Battalion
 RTMC: Dental Battalion
 RTMC: Maintenance Battalion
 RTMC: Transport Battalion
 RTMC: Marine Assault Amphibious Vehicle Support Company
 RTMC: Marine Band Platoon

Gallery

External links

References

Royal Thai Navy
Thai
Military units and formations of Thailand
Military units and formations established in 1978
Military units and formations established in 1989